Dracaenura agramma is a moth in the family Crambidae. It is found on Samoa.

References

Moths described in 1886
Spilomelinae